Ivan-John du Preez (born 23 June 1994) is a South African professional rugby union player for the  in the Currie Cup. He can play as a loose-forward or a winger.

Career

Youth

Du Preez joined the Stellenbosch Rugby Academy in 2013 and was also a member of the  side that competed at the 2013 World Club 7s.

Senior career

Du Preez was called up into the  squad for the 2014 Vodacom Cup competition and was included on the bench for their first match of the competition against Kenyan representative side . He came on as a half-time replacement to make his first class debut for the team.

References

South African rugby union players
Living people
1994 births
Rugby union players from Port Elizabeth
Eastern Province Elephants players
Rugby union flankers